Ooi Kee Beng (Chinese: 黄基明; pinyin Huáng Jī Míng; born 31 May 1955) is a political historian and Executive Director of Penang Institute. Prior to this, he was the Deputy Director of  ISEAS–Yusof Ishak Institute. He is the founder-editor of the Penang Monthly, ISSUES (Penang Institute), Monographs (Penang Institute) and  ISEAS Perspective (ISEAS). He is also editor of Trends in Southeast Asia, and a columnist for The Edge.

Early life 
Ooi was born and raised in Penang. Educated at La Salle School (Air Itam) and St Xavier's Institution, he did his A-levels at Methodist High School. After three years as sub-editor for The Star and The Straits Echo, he left to study, work and live in Sweden. His PhD from Stockholm University is in Sinology, on political philosophy.

He worked as a court reporter in Penang for The Star newspaper in 1975 before becoming a news sub-editor at The Straits Echo from 1975 to 1978.

Career 
Before returning to the region, he worked at Ericsson Electronics in Sweden for 22 years during the heyday of the company's mobile phone era, while studying in Stockholm University for series of degrees. Courses that he taught at Stockholm University included Chinese History, Chinese Philosophy and General Knowledge of China. His most intimate academic interests are in Language Philosophy and Ancient Chinese Political and Strategic Thinking.

He was visiting associate professor at the City University of Hong Kong (2009-2012); and adjunct associate professor at the National University of Singapore’s Department of Southeast Asian Studies (2009-2011)  He is senior fellow at Jeffrey Cheah Institute for Southeast Asia at Subang, Selangor, and adjunct professor at Taylor's College, Selangor.

He joined Singapore's Institute of Southeast Asian Studies (now ISEAS–Yusof Ishak Institute) in 2004, becoming its Deputy Director from 2011 to 2017. He is presently Visiting Senior Fellow at that Institute.

In 2017, he was appointed executive director of Penang Institute. Through the institute, he is a member of numerous Penang state committees, and is advisor for the Penang2030 state vision, and board member of Digital Penang.

Penang Institute is a major think tank in Malaysia. Supported by the Penang State Government, it publishes the city magazine Penang Monthly and ISSUES policy briefs among other periodicals. It is advisor to the Penang State Government, carries out research on matters relating to the state of Penang, and raises socioeconomic and other issues for public debate.

The institute works closely with other state bodies, and with regional think tanks, universities, international organisations and various embassies.

Writings 
Ooi writes regular opinion pieces for regional and global mass media on Malaysian matters and regional matters. These have been compiled in seven separate volumes. Many of these works can be accessed at https://wikibeng.com/. He is the Founder-Editor of Penang Monthly, ISSUES (Penang Institute) and Monographs (Penang Institute); and ISEAS Perspective (ISEAS). He is also Series Editor for Trends in Southeast Asia (ISEAS), and a columnist for The Edge

He has written several biographies on important political personalities of Malaysia and Singapore, such as Tun Dr Ismail, Lim Kit Siang, H. S. Lee, Yusof Ishak and Goh Keng Swee.

His books have won the following awards:

 Award of Excellence for Best writing published in book form or any aspect of Asia (non-fiction) at the Asian Publishing Convention Awards 2008, for The Reluctant Politician: Tun Dr Ismail and His Time (ISEAS 2007)
 Top Academic Work awarded in 2008 by ASEAN Book Publishers Association (ABPA) to Continent, Coast, Ocean: Dynamics of Regionalism in Eastern Asia (ATMA & ISEAS, 2007), co-edited with Ding Choo Ming

Bibliography 

As Empires Fell: The Life and Times of Lee Hau-Shik (2020)

Month by Month (2019)

Catharsis: A Second Chance for Democracy in Malaysia (2018)

Yusof Ishak: A Man of Many Firsts (2017)

The Eurasian Core & Its Edges: Dialogues with Wang Gungwu on the History of the World (2015)

Merdeka for the Mind. Essays on Malaysian Struggles in the 21st Century (2015) (Editor)

The Third ASEAN Reader (2015) (Editor)

Done Making Do: 1Party Rule Ends in Malaysia (Genta Media & ISEAS 2013)

The Right to Differ: A Biographical Sketch of Lim Kit Siang (2011)

In Lieu of Ideology: An Intellectual Biography of Goh Keng Swee (2010)

Malaya's First Year at the United Nations (2009) (Co-edited with Tawfik Ismail)

March 8: Eclipsing May 13 (2008) (Co-authored with Johan Saravanamuttu & Lee Hock Guan)

The Reluctant Politician: Tun Dr Ismail and His Time (2007)

Continent, Coast, Ocean: Dynamics of Regionalism in Eastern Asia (2007) (Co-editor)

Sunzis krigskonst (first ever translation of Sunzi's Art of War into Swedish) 1995.

Wuzis krigskonst (first ever translation of Wuzi's Art of War into Swedish) 1996.

Weliaozi's krigskonst (first ever translation of Weiliaozi's Art of War into Swedish) 1997.

Honours 
Ooi was conferred a Darjah Setia Pangkuan Negeri (DSPN), which carries the title Dato', by the Governor of Penang, Abdul Rahman Abbas in 2017.

References 

1955 births
Political historians
Living people